Burford House may refer to:

 The Burford House Hotel at Burford
 Burford House, Windsor, Nell Gwyn's house, Berkshire, England
 Burford House, Shropshire
 Burford House (New Hampshire)

See also 
 Buford House (disambiguation)